In commutative algebra, a regular local ring is a Noetherian local ring having the property that the minimal number of generators of its maximal ideal is equal to its Krull dimension. In symbols, let A be a Noetherian local ring with maximal ideal m, and suppose a1, ..., an is a minimal set of generators of m.  Then by Krull's principal ideal theorem n ≥ dim A, and A is defined to be regular if n = dim A.

The appellation regular is justified by the geometric meaning. A point x on an algebraic variety X is nonsingular if and only if the local ring  of germs at x is regular. (See also: regular scheme.) Regular local rings are not related to von Neumann regular rings.

For Noetherian local rings, there is the following chain of inclusions:

Characterizations
There are a number of useful definitions of a regular local ring, one of which is mentioned above. In particular, if  is a Noetherian local ring with maximal ideal , then the following are equivalent definitions
 Let  where  is chosen as small as possible. Then  is regular if
,
where the dimension is the Krull dimension.
Then  is regular if
,
where the second dimension is the Krull dimension.
Then  is regular if
,
in which case, .

Multiplicity one criterion states: if the completion of a Noetherian local ring A is unimixed (in the sense that there is no embedded prime divisor of the zero ideal and for each minimal prime p) and if the multiplicity of A is one, then A is regular. (The converse is always true: the multiplicity of a regular local ring is one.) This criterion corresponds to a geometric intuition in algebraic geometry that a local ring of an intersection is regular if and only if the intersection is a transversal intersection.

No similar result is known in the characteristic zero (just because how to replace Frobenius is unclear).

Examples
 Every field is a regular local ring. These have (Krull) dimension 0. In fact, the fields are exactly the regular local rings of dimension 0.
 Any discrete valuation ring is a regular local ring of dimension 1 and the regular local rings of dimension 1 are exactly the discrete valuation rings. Specifically, if k is a field and X is an indeterminate, then the ring of formal power series k is a regular local ring having (Krull) dimension 1.
 If p is an ordinary prime number, the ring of p-adic integers is an example of a discrete valuation ring, and consequently a regular local ring, which does not contain a field.
 More generally, if k is a field and X1, X2, ..., Xd are indeterminates, then the ring of formal power series k is a regular local ring having (Krull) dimension d.
 If A is a regular local ring, then it follows that the formal power series ring A is regular local.
 If Z is the ring of integers and X is an indeterminate, the ring Z[X](2, X) (i.e. the ring Z[X] localised in the prime ideal (2, X) ) is an example of a 2-dimensional regular local ring which does not contain a field.
 By the structure theorem of Irvin Cohen, a complete regular local ring of Krull dimension d that contains a field k is a power series ring in d variables over an extension field of k.

Non-examples 
The ring  is not a regular local ring since it is finite dimensional but does not have finite global dimension. For example, there is an infinite resolution

Using another one of the characterizations,  has exactly one prime ideal , so the ring has Krull dimension , but  is the zero ideal, so  has  dimension at least . (In fact it is equal to  since  is a basis.)

Basic properties
The Auslander–Buchsbaum theorem states that every regular local ring is a unique factorization domain.

Every localization of a regular local ring is regular.

The completion of a regular local ring is regular.

If  is a complete regular local ring that contains a field, then
,

See also: Serre's inequality on height and Serre's multiplicity conjectures.

Origin of basic notions

Regular local rings were originally defined by Wolfgang Krull in 1937, but they first became prominent in the work of Oscar Zariski a few years later, who showed that geometrically, a regular local ring corresponds to a smooth point on an algebraic variety.  Let Y be an algebraic variety contained in affine n-space over a perfect field, and suppose that Y is the vanishing locus of the polynomials f1,...,fm.  Y is nonsingular at P if Y satisfies a Jacobian condition: If M = (∂fi/∂xj) is the matrix of partial derivatives of the defining equations of the variety, then the rank of the matrix found by evaluating M at P is n − dim Y.  Zariski proved that Y is nonsingular at P if and only if the local ring of Y at P is regular. (Zariski observed that this can fail over non-perfect fields.)  This implies that smoothness is an intrinsic property of the variety, in other words it does not depend on where or how the variety is embedded in affine space.  It also suggests that regular local rings should have good properties, but before the introduction of techniques from homological algebra very little was known in this direction.  Once such techniques were introduced in the 1950s, Auslander and Buchsbaum proved that every regular local ring is a unique factorization domain.

Another property suggested by geometric intuition is that the localization of a regular local ring should again be regular.   Again, this lay unsolved until the introduction of homological techniques.  It was Jean-Pierre Serre who found a homological characterization of regular local rings: A local ring A is regular if and only if A has finite global dimension, i.e. if every A-module has a projective resolution of finite length.  It is easy to show that the property of having finite global dimension is preserved under localization, and consequently that localizations of regular local rings at prime ideals are again regular.  

This justifies the definition of regularity for non-local commutative rings given in the next section.

Regular ring

In commutative algebra, a regular ring is a commutative Noetherian ring, such that the localization at every prime ideal is a regular local ring: that is, every such localization has the property that the minimal number of generators of its maximal ideal is equal to its Krull dimension.

The origin of the term regular ring lies in the fact that an affine variety is nonsingular (that is every point is regular) if and only if its ring of regular functions is regular.

For regular rings, Krull dimension agrees with global homological dimension.

Jean-Pierre Serre defined a regular ring as a commutative noetherian ring of finite global homological dimension. His definition is stronger than the definition above, which allows regular rings of infinite Krull dimension.

Examples of regular rings include fields (of dimension zero) and Dedekind domains.  If A is regular then so is A[X], with dimension one greater than that of A. 

In particular if  is a field, the ring of integers, or a principal ideal domain, then the polynomial ring  is regular. In the case of a field, this is Hilbert's syzygy theorem.

Any localization of a regular ring is regular as well.

A regular ring is reduced but need not be an integral domain. For example, the product of two regular integral domains is regular, but not an integral domain.

See also 
Geometrically regular ring

Notes

Citations

References

 Kunz, Characterizations of regular local rings of characteristic p. Amer. J. Math. 91 (1969), 772–784.
 Tsit-Yuen Lam, Lectures on Modules and Rings, Springer-Verlag, 1999, .  Chap.5.G.
 Jean-Pierre Serre, Local algebra, Springer-Verlag, 2000, .  Chap.IV.D.
 Regular rings at The Stacks Project

Algebraic geometry
Ring theory